Ralph Cowan was a Scottish professional football full back who made one appearance in the Scottish League for Rangers.

References 

Year of birth missing
Year of death missing
Place of birth missing
Brentford F.C. wartime guest players
Scottish footballers
Association football fullbacks
Scottish Football League players
Rangers F.C. players
Dumbarton F.C. players
Stirling Albion F.C. players